Harrow-on-the-Hill is an interchange railway station in Harrow, served by suburban London Underground Metropolitan line services and commuter National Rail services on the London–Aylesbury line. Harrow-on-the-Hill is the final Metropolitan line stop from Central London before the line splits with the main branch towards Moor Park and the diverged Uxbridge branch towards Uxbridge. It is in Travelcard Zone 5.

History
The station was opened as "Harrow" on 2 August 1880, when the Metropolitan Railway was extended from its previous terminus at Willesden Green. Its name was changed to "Harrow-on-the-Hill" on 1 June 1894. Like some other Underground stations, the name is an example of marketing rather than precision; in this case the town "proper" of the same name is at the top of Harrow Hill (i.e. Harrow-on-the-Hill), while the station is located at the foot of the hill to the north, which at the time of opening was a small hamlet called Greenhill and has since become the main town proper of Harrow.

Had the governors of Harrow School not made objections during the planning stage, it is possible that the Metropolitan Railway might have followed a different route taking it closer to the town centre on the hill. The station is at the heart of Metroland.

The National Rail service began as the Great Central Railway (GCR) on 15 March 1899. The GCR ran on the former Great Central Main Line, an intercity trunk route and provided services from Harrow to destinations such as Rugby, Leicester, Nottingham and Manchester. The passenger service north of Aylesbury ceased in 1966 due to the Beeching Axe. There was a goods yard, which closed on 3 April 1967.

Railway geography
The station is a major junction with numerous crossovers north and south of station enabling flexibility when routing trains.

South of the station there are four LU tracks paired by direction as "Fast" and "Local" lines to/from Baker Street and two "Main line" tracks to/from Marylebone.

North of the station, the Uxbridge branch diverges from the other routes by means of a burrowing junction. Above this, Harrow North Junction separates the "Local line" towards North Harrow and the "Main line" towards Moor Park.

Services

London Underground
London Underground services at Harrow-on-the-Hill are provided by the Metropolitan line. The adjacent Underground stations are Northwick Park (all stations southbound), Moor Park (fast northbound), North Harrow (all stations northbound) and West Harrow (towards Uxbridge). The Metropolitan line is unique in operating an express service. "Fast" and "Semi-fast" services (now mostly reserved for peak times) do not stop between Harrow-on-the-Hill and Finchley Road. The "Fast" lines at stations between Moor Park, Harrow and Wembley Park have no platforms.

Southbound services go to either Baker Street (4tph) or continue beyond to the line's terminus at Aldgate (12tph). Off-peak trains from Amersham (2tph), Chesham (2tph) and Uxbridge (8tph) generally terminate at Aldgate, with a 4tph service from Watford to Baker Street, however during peak hours trains from all branches go to/from all destinations.

Bus Network 
Adjacent to Harrow-on-the-Hill Underground station is Harrow Bus Station.

National Rail
The National Rail service at Harrow-on-the-Hill is provided by Chiltern Railways. Services operate between Marylebone station and Aylesbury using the separate Network Rail tracks from London to Harrow and sharing London Underground tracks between Harrow and Amersham. Chiltern Railways started operating in 1996 after the privatisation of British Rail and typically provide two trains per hour between Aylesbury and London via Harrow.

Station layout

The station building is above ground with the six platforms in a cutting. Two (on the South side) are predominantly used by NR services and the other four by the Metropolitan line; the NR platforms are electrified with the LU system (normal services are operated by diesel trains) and incoming LU trains on some routes can be diverted into them should this be necessary during closures of tracks in the area.

The station has two entrances, one on Station Approach (leading to Lowlands Road and Harrow Hill) and one on College Road (for Harrow Bus Station and the main shopping area).

During opening hours the Station is popular as a shortcut, removing the longer walk via the bridge at Station Road, as it is possible to walk through the bridge and use the public toilets without passing through the ticket gates.

The present main station building replaced older structures at the London end of the platforms (thus leaving Station Road with no station); it consists of a  circulating area above the tracks with stairways leading down to all platforms and both street entrances.

A pedestrian tunnel once connected all the platforms to the adjacent and now closed Post Office sorting office, whose site was redeveloped.

An office block called Avanta House was built in the 1980s on top of the station's College Road entrance.

Harrow-on-the-Hill gained step-free access from College Road as part of a tranche of access improvements scheduled for completion in 2020; that work, which also introduced lifts to the platforms served by Chiltern Railways, was completed in March 2022 but passengers approaching the station from the south (Lowlands Road) are still required to ascend flights of steps.

Bus station

There is a bus station located next to the station offering London Buses services right across North London.

Gallery

References

External links

 

Metropolitan line stations
Tube stations in the London Borough of Harrow
Railway stations in the London Borough of Harrow
Former Metropolitan and Great Central Joint Railway stations
Railway stations in Great Britain opened in 1880
Railway stations served by Chiltern Railways
Harrow on the Hill